In mathematics, Owen's T function T(h, a), named after statistician Donald Bruce Owen, is defined by

The function was first introduced by Owen in 1956.

Applications
The function T(h, a) gives the probability of the event (X > h and 0 < Y < aX) where X and Y are independent standard normal random variables.

This function can be used to calculate bivariate normal distribution probabilities and, from there, in the calculation of multivariate normal distribution probabilities.
It also frequently appears in various integrals involving Gaussian functions.

Computer algorithms for the accurate calculation of this function are available; quadrature having been employed since the 1970s.

Properties
 
 
 
 
 
 
 
Here Φ(x) is the standard normal cumulative distribution function
 
More properties can be found in the literature.

References

Software
 Owen's T function (user web site) - offers C++, FORTRAN77, FORTRAN90, and MATLAB libraries released under the LGPL license LGPL
 Owen's T-function is implemented in Mathematica since version 8, as OwenT.

External links
 Why You Should Care about the Obscure (Wolfram blog post)

Normal distribution
Computational statistics
Functions related to probability distributions